Idse is an island in Strand municipality in Rogaland county, Norway. The island of Idsal lies immediately to the south and the island of Heng lies a short distance to the north of Idse. There is a bridge connecting Idse to neighboring Idsal, which in turn is connected to the mainland.

Description
There are about 40 farms on the south and east sides of the island, but in recent years there has been a significant decline with only three active dairy farmers remaining. The other farms grow potatoes, tomatoes, cucumbers, strawberries, blueberries, and Christmas trees.  The north and west sides of the island are more hilly and forested and that area is populated with many holiday cabins. At Tangane and Kjeksevåg, there are cabins that date back to the 1940s. There were families from the Stavanger area who fled the city during World War II and built cottages on Idse. In recent years, the cottage development has been very expansive, which probably has to do with good location near the cities of Stavanger and Sandnes. There are currently between 300 and 400 condos on the island.  Historically, there was a grocery store and post office on the pier at Idse, but both are now closed. In 1917, a telephone line was built between Jørpeland and Idse.

Notable residents
Tore Thorsen  Idsøe, founder of the renowned butcher shop A. Idsøe Holding,  was born in 1796 in Idse. He was married in 1826 with Siri Ådnesdatter Selvik, born 1802 at Selvik in Høle. The business they established in 1828 is currently Stavanger's oldest firm. It is commonly considered one of Stavanger's better
butcher shops and meat markets.

See also
List of islands of Norway

References

External links
Idse Map from Norgeskart.no  
A. Idsøe AS website
Islands of Rogaland
Strand, Norway